Metacryphaeus is an extinct genus of trilobites from the family Calmoniidae. Metacryphaeus fossils have been found in Bolivia, Brazil, South Africa and Uruguay. The genus was named in 1907.

References

Phacopida genera
Calmoniidae